Sweden competed at the 1994 Winter Olympics in Lillehammer, Norway.

Medalists

Alpine skiing

Men

Men's combined

Women

Women's combined

Biathlon

Men

Men's 4 × 7.5 km relay

Women

Women's 4 × 7.5 km relay

 1 A penalty loop of 150 metres had to be skied per missed target.
 2 One minute added per missed target.

Bobsleigh

Cross-country skiing

Men

 1 Starting delay based on 10 km results. 
 C = Classical style, F = Freestyle

Men's 4 × 10 km relay

Women

 2 Starting delay based on 5 km results. 
 C = Classical style, F = Freestyle

Women's 4 × 5 km relay

Freestyle skiing

Men

Women

Ice hockey

Summary

An exciting Gold medal game saw Sweden force overtime by tying the score with less than two minutes to go. After a scoreless overtime, the winner was determined by a shootout. The first five rounds saw two players for each side make their penalty shots (Nedved and Kariya for Canada and Forsberg and Svennson for Sweden). In the sixth round, both Nedved and Svensson missed their shots. Forsberg then scored on Canadian goaltender Hirsch to start the seventh round. Kariya took Canada's seventh round shot and was stopped by Swedish goaltender Salo—giving the Swedes the gold medal.

In 1995, the Swedish postal service memorialized Forsberg's game winning shootout goal. Because Hirsch would not grant permission for his likeness to be used on the stamp he was 'disguised' by means of changing the color of his sweater and his player number.

Group B
Twelve participating teams were placed in the two groups. After playing a round-robin, the top four teams in each group advanced to the Medal Round while the last two teams competed in the consolation round for the 9th to 12th places.

Final round
Quarter final

|}

Semi-final

|}

Gold medal match

|}

Leading scorers

Team roster
Håkan Algotsson
Tommy Salo
Michael Sundlöv
Christian Due-Boje
Roger Johansson
Tomas Jonsson
Kenny Jönsson
Leif Rohlin
Fredrik Stillman
Magnus Svensson
Jonas Bergqvist
Charles Berglund
Andreas Dackell
Niklas Eriksson
Peter Forsberg
Roger Hansson
Patrik Juhlin
Jörgen Jönsson
Patric Kjellberg
Håkan Loob
Mats Näslund
Daniel Rydmark
Stefan Örnskog
Head coach: Curt Lundmark

Luge

Men

(Men's) Doubles

Short track speed skating

Men

Ski jumping 

Men's team large hill

 1 Four teams members performed two jumps each.

Speed skating

Men

Women

References

External links
 Olympic Winter Games 1994, full results by sports-reference.com

Nations at the 1994 Winter Olympics
1994
Winter Olympics